Purushottama (from पुरुष, purusha "spirit" or "male" and उत्तम, uttama, "highest") is an epithet of the Hindu preserver deity, Vishnu. According to Vaishnavism, Vishnu is the source of moksha, the liberator of sins, the fount of knowledge, and the highest of all beings.

Etymology 
The epithet means the "Supreme Purusha", "Supreme Being," or "Supreme God". 

It has alternatively also been put forth to mean: "One who is the Supreme Purusha, beyond the kshara (destructible — i.e., Prakṛti), and akshara (indestructible — i.e., Atman)".

Literature
Purushottama is one of the names of Vishnu, and appears as the 24th name of the deity in the Vishnu Sahasranama of the Mahabharata. Rama as an avatara of Vishnu is called Maryada Purushottama, whereas Krishna as an avatara of Vishnu is known as Leela Purushottama.

Bhagavad Gita 
The Bhagavad Gita invokes this epithet in its verses:

Harivamsha 
In the Harivamsha, Brahma refers to Vishnu by this epithet before the events of the Samudra Manthana:

Garuda Purana 
The epithet is featured in the Vishnu Panjaram, a mantram to the deity:

Purushottama was explained by the philosopher Haridas Chaudhuri (1913–1975) as representing that ineffable phenomenon that lies even beyond the undifferentiated Godhead.

See also 

 Vishnu Sahasranama
 Parameshvara
 Mahadevi

References

Sources

 
 

God in Hinduism
Forms of Krishna

Forms of Vishnu